Ghulami is a 1985 Pakistani Punjabi-language film.

Cast
 Sultan Rahi - (Haider)
 Mustafa Qureshi - (Makhan Singh)
 Mohammad Ali - (John)
 Yousuf Khan - (Akbar)
 Rani - (Rani)
 Nazli - (Bantoo)
 Saiqa - (Banoo)
 Nannha - (Maan Singh)
 Zummarrad - (Dancer)
 Sawan - (Dara Daku)
 Zahir Shah - (Mangal Singh)
 Adeeb - (Jagat Singh)
 Afzaal Ahmed - (Farangi)
 Bahar - (Sabra)
 Tanzeem Hassan - (Sona Singh)
 Jaggi Malik - (Chann Singh)
 Nasrullah Butt - (Charan Singh)
 Jahangir Mughal
 Mustafa Tind
 Sikedar 
 Hairat Angez

Songs (album) 
For all the film's songs, the music composer was Wajahat Attre and the film song lyrics were by Khawaja Pervez.

 Noor Jehan

References

External links
 

Films set in Lahore
Films set in the partition of India
Films set in Punjab, Pakistan
Pakistani action drama films
Pakistani crime action films
1985 films
Punjabi-language Pakistani films
1980s Punjabi-language films